Tamara Oudenaarden (born 11 August 1987) is a Canadian long track speed skater.

She was an alternate skater at the 2010 Winter Olympics in Vancouver in the women's 500 metre competition, but did not race in the event since all other qualifying Canadian skaters competed.

She is of Dutch descent.

References

External links
Tamara Oudenaarden at the 2010 Winter Olympics

1987 births
Living people
Canadian female speed skaters
Canadian people of Dutch descent
Sportspeople from St. Albert, Alberta
21st-century Canadian women